Joe Meno (born 1974) is an American novelist, writer of short fiction, playwright, and music journalist based in Chicago.

Biography
After attending Columbia College Chicago, Meno spent time working as a flower delivery truck driver and art therapy teacher at a juvenile detention center. His first novel Tender as Hellfire was published when he was only 24 and received strong reviews from sources like Library Journal.  His short fiction has appeared in literary magazines like TriQuarterly, Ninth Letter, Joyland: A hub for short fiction, and Other Voices. He currently teaches fiction writing at Columbia College Chicago. He is a frequent contributor to Punk Planet magazine, where his comic strip Iceberg Town is featured.

Selected bibliography
Tender as Hellfire.  Akashic Books, 2007/St. Martin's Press, 1999.
How the Hula Girl Sings. Akashic Books, 2005/ReganBooks, 2001. 
Hairstyles of the Damned.  Akashic Books, 2004.
Bluebirds Used to Croon in the Choir: Stories. Northwestern University Press, 2005.
The Boy Detective Fails.  Akashic Books, 2006.
Demons in the Spring. Akashic Books, 2008.
The Great Perhaps. W. W. Norton, 2009.
Office Girl. Akashic Books, 2012.
Marvel and a Wonder. Akashic Books, 2015.

Plays
The Boy Detective Fails.
Once Upon a Time or the Secret Language of Birds.
Star Witness.

Musicals
The Boy Detective Fails.

Awards

Nelson Algren Award, 2003 a prize for short fiction given by the Chicago Tribune.

Hairstyles of the Damned was selected for the Barnes & Noble Discover Great New Writers program for its November 2004 – January 2005 season.

Bluebirds Used to Croon in the Choir was selected as the winner of the Society of Midland Author's Award for Fiction 2005.

Demons in the Spring was a finalist for The Story Prize in 2009.

The Great Perhaps was a winner of the Great Lakes Book Award for Fiction in 2009 and a New York Times Book Review Editor's Choice.

References

Sources

Gale Online Literature Resource Center. Updated June, 2003.

External links

 JoeMeno.com
 Video: A message from Joe Meno about The Great Perhaps
 Author Profile  on Akashic Books Online
 Interview on Bookslut.com
 Fogged Clarity's Interview with Joe Meno (June, 2009)
 Interview on Centerstage Chicago (October 2006)
 

1974 births
Living people
21st-century American novelists
American male novelists
Columbia College Chicago faculty
Writers from Chicago
American male short story writers
21st-century American short story writers
21st-century American male writers
Novelists from Illinois